Ferus Mustafov, also known as King Ferus Mustafov (born December 20, 1950), is a Macedonian saxophonist of Romani descent. He is a multi-instrumentalist and is highly popular in his home country for his repertoire of Balkan folk and gypsy, or Rom, wedding music. He is also credited as one of the artists from the Balkan region to have made this type of music internationally popular.

Biography
Mustafov was born in Štip, Yugoslavia, into a Xoraxane family of musicians and is the son of Ilmi Jašarov who is credited with introducing the saxophone into the folk music of the area.

His professional career began at the age of seventeen whilst studying violin and clarinet at his local junior music academy. During this time he was invited to go on tour with a band led by Toma Črčev, the tour's success led him to abandon his academic learning to become a working musician.

Following a year of military service, during which he established his reputation playing at evening dances, he moved to Sarajevo, Bosnia and Herzegovina, where he took a leading role in the explosion in popularity of folk music taking place there at the time. Later he became a director of musical programming in the Rom language for Radio Television in Skopje, Republic of Macedonia, and gained an international audience through his album releases on world music record labels such as Globe Style and Tropical.

Discography

Albums
 Ora i Coceci (Horas And Belly Dance Music) (1984), RTB
 Ferus Mustafov & His Guests: 1 + 4 (1989), Diskos
 Najgolemi Hitovi (Greatest Hits) (1993), Falcon
 King Ferus also known as Macedonian Wedding Soul Cooking (1995), Globe Style
 The Heat of Balkan Gypsy Soul (2002), Tropical
 Legends of Gypsy Music from Macedonia (2008), Arc

Singles
 "Митино Коло" (1978), PGP-RTB

Compilation appearances
Ring Ring 1996 (1997), B92
The Rough Guide to the Music of Eastern Europe (1999), World Music Network

References

External links 
 Balkan World Music Management management agency biography
 Ferus Mustafov on discogs.com
 [ King Ferus Mustafov] on allmusic.com

Living people
Macedonian composers
Male composers
Macedonian musicians
Macedonian Romani people
Macedonian songwriters
Male songwriters
People from Štip
Romani musicians
1950 births